Spec Ops II: Green Berets is a tactical shooter video game developed by Zombie Studios and published by Ripcord Games exclusively for Microsoft Windows. It is the second game in the Spec Ops series. A remake was released in 2000 for the Dreamcast entitled Spec Ops II: Omega Squad.

Reception

Green Berets received mixed reviews according to GameRankings, while Omega Squad also received mixed reviews according to Metacritic. Max Everingham of NextGen called the former "a second effort that, stupefyingly, manages to be far worse than the first."

Expansion
Spec Ops II: Operation Bravo is an expansion pack and was released online the following year.

References

External links
 
 

1999 video games
Dreamcast games
Multiplayer and single-player video games
Tactical shooter video games
Video games developed in the United States
Video games set in Germany
Video games set in North Korea
Video games set in Pakistan
Video games set in Thailand
Windows games
Zombie Studios games
Ripcord Games games